William Edward Gambrell (born September 18, 1941 in Athens, Georgia) is a former American football wide receiver in the National Football League. Drafted by the Boston Patriots in the 12th round (92nd overall) of the 1963 American Football League Draft, Gambrell played for the NFL's St. Louis Cardinals (1963–1967) and Detroit Lions (1968).

Gambrell won the Most Valuable Player award in the Playoff Bowl on January 3, 1965 after he caught 6 passes for 184 yards and two touchdowns in the Cardinals 24-17 win over the Green Bay Packers.

References

1941 births
Living people
Sportspeople from Athens, Georgia
Players of American football from Georgia (U.S. state)
American football wide receivers
South Carolina Gamecocks football players
St. Louis Cardinals (football) players
Detroit Lions players